Bittercress or Bitter-cress may refer to:

 Barbarea vulgaris
 Any plant in the genus Cardamine, especially Cardamine bulbosa or Cardamine hirsuta